"Pennies from Heaven" is a 1936 American popular song  with music by Arthur Johnston and lyrics by Johnny Burke. It was introduced by Bing Crosby with Georgie Stoll and his Orchestra in the 1936 film of the same name.

Background
It was recorded in 1936 by Billie Holiday and afterwards performed by Doris Day, Arthur Tracy, Tony Bennett, Dinah Washington, Clark Terry, Big Joe Turner, Lester Young, Dean Martin, Gene Ammons, The Skyliners (a hit in 1960), Legion of Mary, Guy Mitchell, and Harry James.

The July 24, 1936, recording by Bing Crosby and the Georgie Stoll Orchestra topped the charts for ten weeks in 1936 and was inducted into the Grammy Hall of Fame in 2004. He recorded another version on August 17, accompanied by Louis Armstrong, Frances Langford and the Jimmy Dorsey Orchestra. Crosby recorded the song again for his 1954 album Bing: A Musical Autobiography.

The recording by Louis Prima on the soundtrack of the 2003 movie Elf helped bring the song to prominence to new generations.

Other versions
On July 21, 1936 at Victor's Hollywood Studio, Eddy Duchin and his Orchestra made the first recording of "Pennies from Heaven." It was released on October 14, 1936 on Victor 25431 and rose to number 2 on the Billboard charts. Jimmy Dorsey also recorded it on August 4, released on Decca 951 in October, and made the chart for one week in December. Then Crosby and Dorsey, along with Louis Armstrong and Frances Langford, made another recording for Decca on August 17, released in October on a 12" Shellac pressing only.

 Louis Armstrong – (1947)
 Count Basie with Jimmy Rushing – (1937)
 Polly Bergen and Gordon MacRae sang a medley which included "Pennies from Heaven" on her 1958 NBC variety show, The Polly Bergen Show.
 Dave Brubeck Quartet- " Brubeck Time " (1954)
 Marty Robbins- "Marty after Midnight" (1962)
 Dave Brubeck with Paul Desmond – The Dave Brubeck Quartet at Carnegie Hall (1963)
 Richard 'Groove' Holmes - Get Up & Get It! (1967)
 Stan Getz with Oscar Peterson – Stan Getz and the Oscar Peterson Trio (1975)
 Billie Holiday's version was used in the 1994 film Corrina, Corrina (1994) and appears on the soundtrack.
 Seth MacFarlane - Sing
 Regis Philbin sang this song for the soundtrack to the game show Who Wants to Be a Millionaire
 Louis Prima – The Call of the Wildest (1957)
 Jimmy Raney with Sonny Clark – Jimmy Raney Quartet (1954)
 Marc Secara recorded the song on You're Everything
 Frank Sinatra recorded two versions, the first one in 1956 with a Nelson Riddle for the "Songs For Swinging Lovers " LP and a second one with Count Basie – Sinatra–Basie: An Historic Musical First (1962)
 The Skyliners (1960) - In the US, this version reached #24 on the Hot 100.
 Arthur Tracy - 1937 recording.
 Led Zeppelin included several lines of the song during live performances of "Dazed and Confused", most notably during their 1971 tour of Japan.
 Rubén Blades recorded the song for his 2021 album "Salswing!" featuring "Roberto Delgado & Orquesta".

See also
List of 1930s jazz standards

References

Film theme songs
1936 songs
1930s jazz standards
Pop standards
Songs written for films
Songs with lyrics by Johnny Burke (lyricist)
Songs with music by Arthur Johnston (composer)
Bing Crosby songs
Billie Holiday songs
Louis Armstrong songs
Tony Bennett songs
Dinah Washington songs
Big Joe Turner songs
Frank Sinatra songs
Dean Martin songs
The Skyliners songs
Guy Mitchell songs
Shirley Bassey songs
The Muppets songs
Andy Williams songs